(born October 11, 1955) is a Japanese pop singer, and actress. Her real name is Kayoko Fujii.

Biography

Megumi Asaoka debuted into showbusiness at age three, with performances varying from stage productions to television commercials.

While she was attending Junior High School, Asaoka modeled for the weekly Japanese magazine Seventeen. While working as a model, she was offered a recording contract. After refusing initially, citing she did not enjoy singing and living a public life, she later accepted in hopes of being able to financially support her family. 

Asaoka made her musical debut in June, 1972, with the single . The single sold over 400,000 copies and reached the No. 3 position on the Oricon charts. That same year, Asaoka won the Best Newcomer prize at the 14th edition of the Japan Record Awards.

In the summer of 1973, the song  (My Boyfriend Is a Lefty) hit the No. 1 spot on the Oricon charts, selling over 500,000 copies. It was the eleventh best-selling song of 1973 in Japan. It has since become her signature tune. She made an appearance on the 24th edition of Kohaku Uta Gassen with this song, and won the popularity award for it at the 15th edition of the Japan Record Awards. The song's popularity was so immense, that manufacturers and businesses capitalised on its success by producing products especially for left-handed people.

Together with fellow Japanese female entertainers Saori Minami and Mari Amachi, Asaoka laid the foundations of the modern Japanese idol. Besides her musical output, Megumi Asaoka is also known in Japan for popularising the Hime cut (princess cut), which became her trademark.

She married Mitsuo Watanabe in September 1977, and retired from showbusiness. In 1983 she divorced Watanabe and subsequently made a comeback. She has one daughter, Hitomi. 

After her comeback, she mainly worked as an actress. In 2009, Asaoka celebrated her 50th year in showbusiness at Sogetsu Hall, performing 28 songs. To this day, Megumi Asaoka occasionally performs songs from her old repertoire. 

In 2011 the Japanese music program Music Station listed her in their Top 50 Idols of All-time based on their sale figures. She was placed no. 47, with sales exceeding 3,000,000.

Discography

Singles

Studio albums

Live albums

References

External links 
 Official profile at Geibun
 

Japanese idols
1955 births
Living people
Japanese women pop singers
Musicians from Ōita Prefecture
20th-century Japanese actresses
21st-century Japanese actresses
20th-century Japanese women singers
20th-century Japanese singers
21st-century Japanese women singers
21st-century Japanese singers